The deputy prime minister of Singapore is the deputy head of government of the Republic of Singapore. The incumbent deputy prime ministers are Heng Swee Keat and Lawrence Wong, who took office on 1 May 2019 and 13 June 2022 respectively.

History
The deputy prime minister is the second highest post, and is a senior Cabinet minister in Singapore. Since the mid-1980s, Singapore has had two deputy prime ministers at a time. The holder will sometimes assume the role of acting prime minister when the prime minister is temporarily absent from Singapore.

The office of Deputy Prime Minister dates back to 1959 and it was first appointed by the Yang di-Pertuan Negara, when Singapore attained self-governance from the British Empire. 

The title of Deputy Prime Minister remained unchanged after the merger with the Federation of Malaya, Sarawak and North Borneo to form Malaysia, while Singapore was a federated state of Malaysia between 1963 and 1965. Toh Chin Chye was the first deputy prime minister of Singapore between 1959 and 1968.

Heng Swee Keat was appointed as Minister of Finance and soon after assumed the office as Deputy Prime Minister on 1 May 2019. Both Teo Chee Hean and Tharman Shanmugaratnam relinquished their positions to become Senior Minister of Singapore. Heng Swee Keat was widely believed to be poised to succeed Lee Hsien Loong as the next prime minister following his appointment as Deputy Prime Minister in May 2019. Heng subsequently withdrew himself from the nomination in April 2021 citing age and health reasons and relinquished his finance portfolio.  

Lawrence Wong assumed the office as Deputy Prime Minister on 13 June 2022, serving alongside Heng Swee Keat after being appointed as Minister of Finance.

List of deputy prime ministers

See also
 Prime Minister of Singapore
 Senior Minister of Singapore
 Prime Minister's Office (PMO)
 Cabinet of Singapore

Notes

External links

 Prime Minister's Office

 
Lists of political office-holders in Singapore
Singapore, Deputy Prime Minister of